Ladislav Rygl Sr. (born 16 July 1947 in Polubný, Kořenov) is a former Czechoslovak nordic combined skier who competed in the late 1960s and early 1970s. He won a gold medal in the individual event at the 1970 FIS Nordic World Ski Championships in Vysoké Tatry. He also competed at the 1968 Winter Olympics and the 1972 Winter Olympics.

Rygl's son, Ladislav Jr., competed in Nordic combined from 1995 to 2006.

References

External links

1947 births
Living people
People from Jablonec nad Nisou District
Czech male Nordic combined skiers
Czechoslovak male Nordic combined skiers
FIS Nordic World Ski Championships medalists in Nordic combined
Universiade medalists in cross-country skiing
Universiade medalists in nordic combined
Universiade bronze medalists for Czechoslovakia
Competitors at the 1972 Winter Universiade
Olympic Nordic combined skiers of Czechoslovakia
Nordic combined skiers at the 1968 Winter Olympics
Nordic combined skiers at the 1972 Winter Olympics
Sportspeople from the Liberec Region